Scopula purata, the chalky wave, is a moth of the family Geometridae. The species was first described by Achille Guenée in 1858. It is found in eastern North America, from Ontario and New Hampshire to Florida and to Mississippi.

References

Moths described in 1858
purata
Moths of North America